Yeşilli is a town in the Yeşilli District of Mardin Province in Turkey. The town had a population of 10,846 in 2021.

Neighborhoods 
The town is divided into the neighborhoods of Bahçebaşı, Gül, Karşıyaka, Şirinevler and Tepebaşı.

Demographics 
The town is populated by Arabs and by Kurds of the Omerkan tribe.

References

External links 
Yeşilli homepage

Populated places in Mardin Province
Arab settlements in Mardin Province
Kurdish settlements in Mardin Province